Gangs in the United States include several types of groups, including national street gangs, local street gangs, prison gangs, motorcycle clubs, and ethnic and organized crime gangs. Approximately 1.4 million people were part of gangs as of 2011, and more than 33,000 gangs were active in the United States.

Many American gangs began, and still exist, in urban areas. In many cases, national street gangs originated in major cities such as New York City and Chicago but they later grew in other American cities like Albuquerque and Washington, D.C.

History 
The earliest American street gangs emerged at the end of the American Revolutionary War in the early 1780s. However, these early street gangs had questionable legitimacy, and more serious gangs did not form until at least the early 1800s. The earliest of these serious gangs formed in northeastern American cities, particularly in New York.

Early street gangs in the Northeast: 1780–1870 

Three main immigrant groups entered the Northeast US via New York in the early 1800s: English, Irish, and German. On the Lower East Side of New York, these immigrant groups formed into gangs in an area known as the Five Points. Of these were the Smiths's Vly gang, the Bowery Boys, and the Broadway Boys, all three of which were predominantly Irish immigrants. These early gangs were not exclusively engaged in criminal activity; their members often were employed as common laborers. Slaves living in New York formed two paramilitary groups which could be seen as "gang" like, Smith's Fly Boys and the Long Bridge Boys. Notable examples of slave rebellions (as well as white backlash to the perceived threat of them) in colonial New York include the New York Slave Revolt of 1712 and the New York Conspiracy of 1741.

After the early 1820s, however, gangs began to focus on criminal activity, one example being the Forty Thieves, which began in the late 1820s in the Five Points area. Other criminal gangs of the pre-Civil War era included the Dead Rabbits and the Five Points Gang. The Five Points Gang in particular became influential in recruiting membership to gangs and toward establishing gang relationships with politicians. By 1855, it was estimated that the city of New York contained 30,000 men who held allegiances to gang leaders. The New York City draft riots were said to have been ignited by young Irish street gangs. Herbert Asbury depicted some of these groups in his history of Irish and American gangs in Manhattan, and his work was later used by Martin Scorsese as the basis for the motion picture Gangs of New York. However, these early gangs reached their peak in the years immediately prior to the Civil War, and gang activity had largely dissipated by the 1870s.

Reemergence and growth: 1870–1940 

During the late 1800s, gangs reemerged as a criminal force in the Northeast, and they emerged as new criminal enterprises in the American West and the Midwest. In New York after the Civil War, the most powerful gang to emerge was the Whyos, which included reconstituted members of previous Five Points area gangs. Another late 19th century New York gang was the Jewish Eastman Gang. Meanwhile, Chinese immigrants formed tongs, which were highly structured gangs involved in gambling and drug trafficking. These tongs were matched in strength by an emerging Italian organized crime network that became the American Mafia.

Gangs emerged in the Midwest in the late 19th and early 20th centuries in Chicago. European immigrant groups such as Poles and Italians formed the core membership of Chicago gangs, while only 1% of gangs were black. However, gangs in the 19th century were often multiethnic, as neighborhoods did not display the social polarization that has segregated different ethnic groups in the postmodern city (see Edward Soja). The gangs of Chicago in the late 19th century were particularly powerful in the areas around the Chicago Stockyards, and engaged in robbery and violent crime.

As in New York and northeastern gangs, it was during the early period of Chicago gang growth that gangs connected themselves politically to local leaders. Such gangs as Ragen's Colts became influential in Chicago politics. By the 1920s, several gangs had grown to the point of becoming organized crime groups in Chicago (e.g. the Chicago Outfit under Al Capone), and gang warfare was common among them. Street gang activity continued alongside these larger criminal organizations; contemporary estimates suggested some 25,000 gang members and 1,300 gangs in Chicago during the late 1920s. By the early 1930s, however, these immigrant-dominated gangs largely died out.

Just as with the Midwest, the American West experienced gang growth during the late 19th century and early 20th century. The earliest Los Angeles gangs were formed in the 1920s, and they were known as "boy gangs"; they were modelled on earlier social groups of Latino and Chicano men known as palomilla. Frequently these groups were composed of Mexican immigrants upon coming to the United States. The youth of this culture became known as the cholo subculture, and several gangs formed from among them.

By the 1920s, cholo subculture and palomilla had merged to form the basis of the Los Angeles gangs. The gangs proliferated in the 1930s and 1940s as adolescents came together in conflict against the police and other authorities. Territoriality was essential to the Los Angeles gangs, and graffiti became an important part of marking territory controlled by gangs. Neighborhood identity and gang identity merged in ways unlike other parts of the United States; in addition, the gangs of the West were different in their ethnic makeup. Finally, they were unique in that, unlike gangs in the Midwest and the Northeast, they did not grow only out of social problems such as poverty, but also out of ethnic segregation and alienation.

Postwar growth and change: 1940–1990 

Gangs reemerged in the Northeast in cities such as New York during the 1950s and 1960s with rising Latino immigration and a rising population of Black Americans migrating from the American South. Although New York built large, urban high-rise public housing in the 1940s, much of the public housing was built in low-rise form and in outer areas during the 1950s and 1960s; the effect of this was to mitigate much of the gang-on-gang violence that other American cities suffered in that period. Although spared gang warfare, New York saw gangs nonetheless form among the youth of the Latino and black population. In 1957 there were 11 murders perpetrated by gangs in Manhattan. By the end of the 1960s, two-thirds of gangs in the city were black or Puerto Rican.

The reemergence of Midwestern gangs also occurred after the rapid increase in the black population of northern American cities. During the 1910s and 1920s, the Great Migration of more than one million black people to these cities created large, extremely poor populations, creating an atmosphere conducive to gang formation. The significant and rapid migration created a large population of delinquent black youth, forming a pool of potential gang members, while black youth athletic groups fueled rivalries that also encouraged gang formation. A final factor encouraging gang formation was the Chicago race riot of 1919, in which gangs of white youth terrorized the black community, and in response black youth formed groups for self-protection.

However, the actual formation of Midwestern black gangs only began after World War II, concomitantly with the Second Great Migration. It was in the late 1940s, 1950s and 1960s that black gangs such as the Devil's Disciples, the Black P-Stones and the Vice Lords were formed. By the late 1960s, the construction of public housing in Chicago allowed gangs to consolidate their power in black neighborhoods, and the Vice Lords, P-Stones, and Gangster Disciples controlled the drug trade of the area. These and others emerged as "super gangs" with more than 1,000 members each by the 1970s.

During and after the 1940s, gangs in the American West expanded dramatically as a result of three factors: expanding immigration from Mexico and the resulting xenophobia, the Sleepy Lagoon murder, and the Zoot Suit Riots. The two latter events served to unify the Mexican immigrant population and turned many youth into gang members,thus creating the so-called Cholo It was also from the 1940s to the 1960s that black gangs emerged as a criminal force in Los Angeles, largely as a result of social exclusion and segregation. Racial anti-black violence on the part of white youths directly contributed to black youths forming self-protection societies that transformed into black gangs by the late 1960s.

As the War on Poverty began to shift into the War on Crime, the idealism of the social movements of the 1960s gave way to ideas of "revolutionary suicide" as police violence against Black Panthers and other radicals began to take its toll. Influential leaders of the black community had been killed: Medgar Evers, Malcolm X,  Martin Luther King Jr. and Fred Hampton. Author and social activist bell hooks wrote "After the slaughter of radical black men, the emotional devastation of soul murder and actual murder, many black people became cynical about freedom." This "nihilism", as Cornel West put it, spread after the 1960s.

Black gangs of Los Angeles began forming into territorial-based groups by the early 1970s, and two federations of black gangs, the Bloods and the Crips, emerged during that period. The practice of allying local street gangs together into federated alliances began during the 1960s and expanded rapidly across the United States during the 1970s and 1980s. Out of the prison system of Illinois came two gang alliances by the late 1970s: the Folk Nation and the People Nation alliances. These two alliances included a variety of white, black, and Hispanic gangs and claimed territory in and around Chicago and other Midwestern cities. Another of these federated alliances were the Latin Kings, originally a Chicago-based Latino gang. In the case of the West, nearly every major city in California reported gang activity by the mid-1970s, and often it was related to gangs affiliating themselves with the Bloods or Crips.

Contemporary activities: 1990–present 
By the 1990s, Northeastern gangs (white, black, and Latino) had come into conflict as a result of urban renewal and ethnic migration. The Northeast had more than 17,000 gang members and more than 600 gangs in 2008, and Pennsylvania saw heavy growth of gang activity. During the 2000s, the most active gangs in the region were federations of the Crips, the Latin Kings, MS-13 (Mara Salvatrucha), Neta, and the Bloods.

In the American West, as job cuts continued to rise and employers began to hire from the cheaper labour pool of the expanding Latino immigrant community, unemployment rates of African-American men reached as high as 50% in several areas of South Los Angeles, opening up large recruitment markets for the burgeoning gangs. The increasing social isolation felt by African-American communities across the nation continued unabated in the 1980s and 90s, leading to higher rates of social pathologies, including violence. Latino gang members interviewed in Napa said they had moved to the valley either to join family, or to find a job, or were motivated by other social pressures like release from a nearby juvenile correctional facility.

As gang-violence accelerated in the West, so too did police violence against African-American communities, which culminated in the arrest of Rodney King which sparked the 1992 Los Angeles riots. In the aftermath of the riots, leaders of the Bloods and the Crips announced a truce (spearheaded by Compton's then mayor Walter R. Tucker, Jr.), and in May 1992, 1,600 rival gang members converged on Imperial Courts, a main housing project of Watts, Los Angeles, California to demonstrate their new-found companionship. But after only a few months of relative harmony, tensions between Los Angeles County's more than 100,000 gang members (in February 1993) began to raise the murder rates, rising to resemble previous levels. Oakland, California saw 113 drug- and/or gang-related homicides in 2002 alone, and 2003 sported similar figures. The 1995 murder of Stephanie Kuhen in Los Angeles led to condemnation from President Bill Clinton and a crackdown on Los Angeles-area gangs.

During the 1990s, the American South saw an increase in gang activity that had not been seen previously. In 1994, Mary Beth Pelz, a criminologist at University of Houston–Downtown, said that Texas lacked "a rich history of street gangs" compared to other parts of the United States. She said Houston area gangs began to branch out to newer developments in the 1980s. According to a 2006 Texas Monthly article by Skip Hollandsworth, many street gangs in Texas have no organized command structures. Individual "cliques" of gangs, defined by streets, parts of streets, apartment complexes, or parts of apartment complexes, act as individual groups. Texas "Cliques" tend to be headed by leaders called "OG"s (short for "original gangsters") and each "clique" performs a specific activity or set of activities in a given area, such as controlling trafficking of recreational drugs and managing prostitution.

In 2009, David Kennedy, director of the Center for Crime Prevention and Control at John Jay College of Criminal Justice of the City University of New York, said that a lot of violence in inner cities in the United States is mislabeled as "gang violence" when in fact it involves small, informal cliques of people.

As gang members and factions continued to grow, the introduction of cheap crack cocaine to American cities would prove fatal. Crack money now could be used to purchase unprecedented amounts of weaponry, and as newly armed gang members began to fight over 'turf', or the territory in which gangs would run their lucrative drug-trades, violence soared, as the FBI's national data of gang-related homicides show: from 288 in 1985 up to 1,362 in 1993.

The targeted killing of the 9-year-old Tyshawn Lee, the son of a Chicago gang member who was lured into an alley and shot in 2015 marked a new low in gang violence, associated with the splintering of gangs into less organized factions often motivated by personal vendettas.

Recruitment 
People join gangs for various reasons. Some individuals become gang members to profit from organized crime in order to obtain necessities such as food or to gain access to luxury goods and services. They may be seeking protection from rival gangs or violent crime in general, especially when the police are distrusted or ineffective. Many are attracted to a sense of family, identity, or belonging. Other motivations include social status, intimidation by gang members, pressure from friends, family tradition, and the excitement of risk-taking.

Studies aimed at preventing youth involvement in gangs have identified additional "risk factors" that increase one's likelihood of joining a gang. Some risk factors that relate to one's family life are family instability, family members with violent attitudes, family poverty, and lack of parental supervision. Victims of violent crime (as well as their friends and family) and members of socially marginalized groups (e.g. ethnic minorities) are more likely to join gangs. Academic problems such as frustration due to low performance, low expectations, poor personal relationships with teachers, and the presence of learning disabilities are all risk factors. Additionally, hyperactivity, low self-esteem, and lack of role models can contribute as well. Involvement in non-gang illegal activity (especially violent crime or drug use) and a lack of youth jobs also increase a person's likelihood of becoming a gang member.

Gang membership is also associated with early sexual activity and illegal gun ownership.

Youth may join gangs due to a lack of other opportunities, such as after school social programs and extra curricular activities.  If a child has thought about or already joined a gang, support groups can help the parents with the next steps. The availability of sports or interest groups is said to reduce the interest in associating with delinquent individuals. When youth join in other social groups, such as a church group or study group, it increases the strength of their social bonds, which when broken or weakened is a cause for delinquent participation.

Activities and types 
 the National Gang Intelligence Center found that American gangs were found to be responsible for "an average of 48% of violent crime in most jurisdictions and up to 90% in several others". Major urban areas and their suburban surroundings experience the majority of gang activity, particularly gang-related violent crime.

Gangs are known to engage in traditionally gang-related gambling, drug trafficking, and arms trafficking, white collar crime such as counterfeiting, identity theft, and fraud, and non-traditional activity of human trafficking and prostitution.

Gangs can be categorized based on their ethnic affiliation, their structure, or their membership. Among the gang types defined by the National Gang Intelligence Center are the national street gang, the prison gang, the motorcycle gang, and the local street gang.

Prison gangs 

American prison gangs, like most street gangs, are formed for protection against other gangs.
The goal of many street gang members is to gain the respect and protection that comes from being in a prison gang. Prison gangs use street gang members as their power base for which they recruit new members. For many members, reaching prison gang status shows the ultimate commitment to the gang.

Some prison gangs are transplanted from the street, and in some occasions, prison gangs "outgrow" the penitentiary and engage in criminal activities on the outside. Many prison gangs are racially oriented. Gang umbrella organizations like the Folk Nation and People Nation have originated in prisons.

One notable American prison gang is the Aryan Brotherhood, an organization known for its violence and white supremacist views. Established in the mid-1960s, the gang was not affiliated with the Aryan Nations and allegedly engages in violent crime, drug trafficking, and illegal gambling activities both in and out of prisons. On July 28, 2006, after a six-year federal investigation, four leaders of the gang were convicted of racketeering, murder, and conspiracy charges. Another significant American prison gang is the Aryan League, which was formed by an alliance between the Aryan Brotherhood and Public Enemy No. 1. Working collaboratively, the gangs engage in drug trafficking, identity theft, and other white collar crime using contacts in the banking system. The gang has used its connections in the banking system to target law enforcement agencies and family members of officers.

There has been a long running racial tension between black and Hispanic prison gangs, as well as significant prison riots in which gangs have targeted each other.

Motorcycle gangs 

The United States has a significant population of motorcycle gangs, which are groups that use motorcycle clubs as organizational structures for conducting criminal activity. Some motorcycle clubs are exclusively motorcycle gangs, while others are only partially compromised by criminal activity. The National Gang Intelligence Center reports on all motorcycle clubs with gang activity, while other government agencies, such as the Bureau of Alcohol, Tobacco, Firearms, and Explosives (ATF) focus on motorcycle clubs exclusively dedicated to gang activity. The ATF estimates that approximately 300 exclusively gang-oriented motorcycle clubs exist in the United States.

Organized crime gangs 

Organized criminal groups are a subtype of gang with a hierarchical leadership structure and in which individuals commit crime for personal gain. For most members of these groups, criminal activities constitute their occupation. There are numerous organized criminal groups with operations in the United States (including transnational organized crime groups), such as Sinaloa Cartel, American Mafia, Latin Kings (gang), Jewish mafia, Triad Society, Russian mafia, Yakuza, Sicilian Mafia, and Irish Mob.

The activities of organized criminal groups are highly varied, and include drug, weapons, and human trafficking (including prostitution and kidnapping), art theft, murder (including contract killings and assassinations), copyright infringement, counterfeiting, identity theft, money laundering, extortion, illegal gambling, and terrorism. The complexity and seriousness of the crimes committed by global crime groups pose a threat not only to law enforcement but to democracy and legitimate economic development as well.

American national and local street gangs will collaborate with organized criminal groups.

Juvenile gangs 
Youth gangs are composed of young people, and like most street gangs, are either formed for protection or for social and economic reasons. Some of the most notorious and dangerous gangs have evolved from youth gangs. During the late 1980s and early 1990s an increase in violence in the United States took place and this was due primarily to an increase in violent acts committed by people under the age of 20. Due to gangs spreading to suburban and smaller communities youth gangs are now more prevalent and exist in all regions of the United States. One of the more popular youth gangs in the Midwest are the NJCK or North Jersey Cross Kids.

Youth gangs have increasingly been creating problems in school and correctional facilities. However youth gangs are said to be an important social institution for low income youths and young adults because they often serve as cultural, social, and economic functions which are no longer served by the family, school or labor market. Youth gangs tend to emerge during times of rapid social change and instability. Young people can be attracted to joining a youth gang for a number of reasons. They provide a degree of order and solidarity for their members and make them feel like part of a group or a community.

The diffusion of gang culture to the point where it has been integrated into a larger youth culture has led to widespread adoption by youth of many of the symbols of gang life. For this reason, more and more youth who earlier may have not condoned gang behavior are more willing, even challenged to experiment with gang-like activity Youth gangs may be an ever-present feature of urban culture that change over time in its form, social meaning and antisocial behavior. However, in the United States, youth gangs have taken an especially disturbing form and continue to permeate society.

Demographics 

In 1999, Hispanic Americans accounted for 47% of all U.S. gang members, African Americans for 34%, non-Hispanic whites for 13%, and Asians for 6%.

Law enforcement agencies reported in 2011 that gangs affiliated with ethnicity and non-traditional gangs had expanded in the years prior.

Hispanic gangs (Mexican, Central American and Caribbean)

Hispanic gangs form the largest group of ethnic-based gangs in the United States. U.S. immigration investigation programs, such as Operation Community Shield, have detained more than 1,400 illegal immigrants who were also gang members, just a tiny fraction of gang members nationwide. ICE's Operation Community Shield has since arrested 7,655 street gang members.  A California Department of Justice study reported in 1995 that 60 percent of the twenty thousand members of the 18th Street gang in California are undocumented immigrants.

The largest Hispanic gang is 18th Street gang and the most violent is MS-13 gang, both run by The Mexican Mafia or La Eme in prison. The Latin Kings first emerged in Chicago in the 1940s after several young Puerto Rican men on the north side—and Mexican men on the south side—organized into a self-defense group to protect their communities. The initial intention was to unite all Latinos into a collective struggle against oppression and to help each other overcome the problems of racism and prejudice that newly arriving Latino immigrants were experiencing. Hence, the name "Latin Kings and Queens", which as it denotes, is a reference to members of all Latino heritages. They organized themselves as a vanguard for their communities. Like the Black Panthers, the Young Lords, and many other groups perceiving social injustices directed at their ethnic group, the Latin Kings were broken as a movement. They lost touch with their roots and grew into one of the largest and most infamous criminal gangs in the United States. The group's members became involved in crimes including murder, drug trafficking, robberies and other organized criminal activities.

The largest Dominican gang, Trinitarios, is the fastest-growing Hispanic gang on the northeastern region. Although as prison gang, the Trinitarios have members operating as a street gang, and it is known for violent crime and drug trafficking in the New York and New Jersey area.

Mara Salvatrucha, commonly abbreviated as "MS-13", is another Hispanic street gang operating in the United States. The "13" in the name is a way to pay allegiance to the Mexican Mafia or La Eme. It originated in Los Angeles and has spread to Central America, other parts of the United States, and Canada. Mara Salvatrucha is one of the most dangerous gangs in the United States, and its activities include drug and weapons trafficking, auto theft, burglary, assault, and murder (including contract killings). The gang also publicly declared that it targets the Minutemen, an anti-immigrant vigilante group to give them "a lesson", possibly due to their smuggling of various Central/South Americans (mostly other gang members), drugs, and weapons across the border. Mara Salvatrucha has been investigated by the FBI and U.S. Immigration and Customs Enforcement, and in September 2005 the gang was targeted by raids against its members, in which 660 people were arrested across the United States. The US treasury department has imposed sanctions on members in MS-13 by freezing assets that are related to the gang's activities. Sanctions were imposed on six members in June 2013 and three members in April 2015. The sanctions in 2013 followed the lines of Executive Order 13581. The efforts to financially disrupt MS-13 have been a collaborative effort of ICE and the Department of Homeland Security.

Other ethnic gangs 
Among other ethnic-based gangs are Asian gangs, which operate similar to Asian organized crime groups with a hierarchical structure and little concern for control of territory. Asian gangs often victimize Asian populations, and law enforcement faces difficulty investigating Asian gangs due to language barriers and distrust among the Asian population. Asian gangs engage in a variety of crime, including violent crime, drug and human trafficking, and white collar crime.

Middle-Eastern gangs operate in some cities, such as the Kurdish Pride Gang (KPG), a street gang that formed in 2000 in Nashville. The gang was involved with drug dealing, home burglaries (including two involving rapes), assault and attempted murder. Two members are serving long prison sentences for the attempted murder of a police officer.

East African gangs operate in over 30 jurisdictions in the United States. They are generally divided between Sudanese gangs, Ethiopian gangs and Somali gangs. Unlike the majority of traditional street gangs, Somali gang members adopt names based on their clan affiliation. Largely keeping to themselves, they have engaged in violent crime, weapons trafficking, human, sex and drug trafficking, and credit card fraud. As of 2013, there has been a decrease in gang-related activity among disaffected Somali youths, as they have grown more settled. Sudanese gangs have emerged in several states since 2003. Among the most aggressive of these Sudanese gangs is the African Pride gang. Some Sudanese gang members also possess strategic and weapons knowledge gained during conflicts in Sudan.

Primarily operating along the East Coast, Caribbean ethnic-based gangs include Haitian, and Jamaican gangs. Haitian gangs, such as Zoe Pound, are involved in a variety of crime, including violent crime and drug and weapons trafficking. U.S.-based Jamaican gangs, unlike those in Jamaica, are unsophisticated and lack hierarchy; however, they often maintain ties to Jamaican organized crime and engage in drug and weapons trafficking.

Female gang membership 

Although female gang membership is less common than male membership, women and girls can become fully-fledged members of mixed-gender or exclusively female gangs. These gangs operate as functioning units, coed gangs, or female auxiliaries to pre-existing male gangs. National gang statistics show that 2% of all gangs are female-only, and the National Gang Center reports that around 10% of all gang members are females.

Gang membership in the military 

Gang members in uniform use their military knowledge, skills, and weapons to commit and facilitate various crimes.

In 2006, Scott Barfield, a Defense Department investigator, said there was an online network of gangs and extremists: "They're communicating with each other about weapons, about recruiting, about keeping their identities secret, about organizing within the military." That same year, an article from the Chicago Sun-Times reported that gangs were encouraging members to enter the military to learn urban warfare techniques and pass them onto other gang members. A January 2007 article in the Chicago Sun-Times reported that gang members in the military are involved in the theft and sale of military weapons, ammunition, and equipment, including body armor. The Sun-Times began investigating the gang activity in the military after receiving photos of gang graffiti showing up in Iraq.

The FBI's 2007 report on gang membership in the military states that the military's recruit screening process is ineffective, allows gang members/extremists to enter the military, and lists at least eight instances in the last three years in which gang members have obtained military weapons for their illegal enterprises. "Gang Activity in the U.S. Armed Forces Increasing", dated January 12, 2007, states that street gangs including the Bloods, Crips, Black Disciples, Gangster Disciples, Hells Angels, Latin Kings, The 18th Street Gang, Mara Salvatrucha (MS-13), Mexican Mafia, Norteños, Sureños (Sur 13), White power Skinhead, King Cobras, and Vice Lords have been documented on military installations both domestic and international, although recruiting gang members violates military regulations.

A 2008 FBI report noted that between 1-2% of the U.S. military has affiliation with a gang.  the National Ground Intelligence Center had identified members of at least 53 gangs whose members were actively serving in the United States Armed Forces.

See also 

 Crime in the United States
 Organized Crime
 List of gangs in the United States

Citations

References

External links 

 National Gang Threat Assessment report by the Federal Bureau of Investigation
 "Street Gang Alliance Guide" (Chicago, IL: Stream by Chicago Gang History)

 
Articles containing video clips